KBS Radio 2 (Hangul: KBS 2 라디오; also known by its nickname Happy FM) is a K-Pop, classical music, and entertainment network of the Korean Broadcasting System. Opened in 1933 on AM Radio, the network began utilising FM Radio frequencies 67 years later for a clearer audio reception.

Radio 2 operates daily from 5:00 am to 3:00 am of the following day. National programs originate from Seoul, with regional opt-outs as well as rebroadcasts of selected KBS 2FM programs are aired across local stations operating on FM and, if applicable, AM radio.

Stations

Seoul, Incheon, Gyeonggi Province

Other Provinces 
 Chuncheon : FM 98.7 MHz
 Wonju : FM 100.5, 88.1 MHz
 Gangneung : FM 102.1 MHz, FM 106.7 MHz, FM 103.9 MHz
 Daejeon : FM 100.9 MHz, FM 89.5 MHz
 Cheongju : FM 90.9 MHz
 Jeonju : FM 92.9 MHz
 Gwangju : FM 95.5 MHz
 Mokpo : FM 88.1 MHz
 Suncheon : FM 102.7 MHz, FM 100.9 MHz, FM 106.7 MHz
 Daegu : AM 558 kHz, FM 102.3 MHz
 Gimcheon : FM 88.9 MHz
 Ulleung Island : FM 92.1 MHz
 Busan : FM 97.1 MHz, FM 99.5 MHz
 Changwon : FM 106.1 MHz, FM 99.7 MHz
 Jeju : FM 91.9 MHz, FM 89.7 MHz, FM 92.7 MHz

History 
 1933 - Chōsen Broadcasting Corporation's Second Broadcasting(JODB, 660 kHz) started broadcasting.
 1947 - Chōsen Broadcasting Corporation Closed. Relunched as KBS Second broadcasting(HLSA).
 1972 - Frequency Moved 660 to 600 kHz.
 November 1, 1978 - Frequency Moved 600 to 603 kHz.
 December 1, 1980 - Renamed as KBS Radio 2. along with the launch of KBS Radio 3, KBS 2FM (Now Cool FM Formerly TBC Radio), KBS Radio Seoul (Now SBS Love FM Formerly DBS) and KBS 1FM (Now Classic FM).
 July 1, 2000 - KBS 2 Radio FM repeater 106.1 MHz Launched.
 October 20, 2003 - KBS Radio 2 Renamed as Happy FM. Reformated as an entertainment radio station for the middle aged.
 March 3, 2005 - Viewable Radio (BORA) Broadcast launched.
 April 25, 2016 - Local Radio 2 stations started cross-broadcast with KBS 2FM in order for the latter to air its selected shows nationally.

See also 
 KBS Radio 1
 EBS FM
 MBC FM4U
 CBS Music FM
 Traffic Broadcasting System
 EBS 1TV
 Far East Broadcasting Company

Radio 2
Radio stations in South Korea
Korean-language radio stations
Radio stations established in 1980
Chinese popular culture
South Korean popular culture